The Blue Mauritius may refer to:

 The Blue Mauritius (upcoming film), an upcoming French-American action-thriller film
 The Blue Mauritius (1918 film), a German silent film
 Blue Mauritius, a postage stamp